Torball (German: goal ball) is a team sport for the blind and vision-impaired.  With some similar structures in the rules in the 1980s, it is different to the Paralympic Games team sport of goalball.

Description 

It is played by two teams on opposite sides of an indoor playing field. Each team consists of three players. In the middle part of the field, there are three cords stretched across the entire width. On each end of the playing field is a goal that also stretches the entire width of the field. The playing ball is similar to a soccer ball with bells inside so that it can be heard when it is rolling across the playing field. 

The object of the game is to score as many goals as possible by rolling the ball under the three cords into the goal of the opposing team. The three-player teams are both attackers and defenders during the two five-minute periods. If the ball touches one of the three cords, a penalty is called, where one player leaves the field and the remaining two players must try to defend their goal for one ‘throw’ by the opposing team.

Rules 

The official rules for torball were previously determined by the International Blind Sports Federation.

Differences with goalball  

Torball is conducted in Europe, whereas goalball is played globally with world championships and is a Paralympic Games event after being demonstrated in 1972.  

Both are indoor sports, three team players at one end of a court, and played with a belled ball.  The goal post is the entire width of the court and has the same  inner goal height.  Both athletes wear a blindfold, regardless of their degree of vision.  Each team can have six players.  

Differences include: 
 Court size.
 Court surface.  Goalball lines are tactile tape markings; Torball has rectangular carpet 'orientation mats' (2 x 1 m) for the players; 
 Ball.
 Game time.  Goalball in 1978 had seven-minute halves, and by 2014, twelve-minute halves; Torball has five-minute halves; 
 Ball movement.  Goalball balls are usually rolled or bounced along the court; Torball has three strings stretched across the court with a  inner clearance, so the ball has to be thrown low along the ground; and 
 Officials.  Goalball has two on-court referees; Torball has one referee.

See also 
 Goalball

References

External links 

 Official website of Torball
 2006 - 2009 Official Torball Rules
 Austrian Sport Organization for the Blind
 Swiss Association for the Impaired People

Team sports
Blind sports